Party for the Netherlands (PVN) is a Dutch right-wing Fortuynist political party founded in August 2006 by Hilbrand Nawijn, a member of the Dutch House of Representatives.

The party was considered one of several splinter groups from the Pim Fortuyn List (LPF) party aiming to become the successor of the LPF. Its list for the 2006 election contained former LPF members such as Gerard van As, Paul Meijer and Willem van der Velden.

After a dismal result of the party in the 2006 election, Hilbrand Nawijn stepped down from national politics. The future of the party itself is uncertain.

References

External links
  Home page of Partij voor Nederland

Conservative liberal parties
Conservative parties in the Netherlands
Defunct nationalist parties in the Netherlands
Political parties in the Netherlands
Political parties established in 2006
Right-wing populism in the Netherlands
Right-wing populist parties
2006 establishments in the Netherlands
Right-wing parties in Europe